Arjun Maini (born 10 December 1997) is an Indian professional racing driver, currently competing in the DTM. He has previously also competed in FIA Formula 2 Championship with Trident Racing, as well as Campos Racing.

Early life 
Maini comes from a family of racers. His brother Kush is also a racer competing in the FIA Formula 3 Championship with MP Motorsport, and his father, Gautam, raced in the National Racing Championship in the late 1990s, at the Formula India Single Seater Maruti Engine. The teenager first fell in love with motorsport when his father gave him an electric car. Maini received his first go-kart, an 80cc Comer Kart at the age of 5.

Maini's uncle Chetan Maini is an Indian business magnate best known for building India's first electric car, REVA, and as the Founder of Reva Electric Car Company Ltd, now Mahindra Electric Mobility Limited, where he served as an advisor.

He idolises Sebastian Vettel and in his free time enjoys wrestling, cycling, fitness activities and video editing.

Career

Karting 
Maini received his first go-kart, an 80cc Comer Kart, at the age of 5. At the young age of 8, Maini won his first two championships, the MRF Mini Max Championship in both the Rotax class and the 4-stroke Cadet class in his first year of racing. After his first titles, Maini raced on foreign soil for the first time in the Asia Max championship, which led to immediate success. In 2008 Maini became the youngest Indian to win a kart race abroad by winning the Malaysian Royal Kelatan Kart Prix held in 2008.

Maini was the youngest driver to take part in the J.K. Tyre Rotax Max Junior Max National championship at the age of 11. He was selected by the Red Rooster Racing Team in 2009. He then took part in the Rotax Max Challenge India - Junior in 2010 and finished in 2nd place, with the highest number of fastest laps. Maini's major breakthrough came in 2011 where he won the J.K.Tyre Rotax Max National Karting Championship title in the Junior Max category and followed this up by becoming the Sahara Force India team's One from a Billion winner. He was also the winner of AKOC race in Macau as well as the Ask KF3 Race in Elite, Malaysia. He finished second overall in the AKS Malaysian Championship 2011.

In his penultimate year of karting, Maini finished a creditable fifth in the ROK Cup International Final in Junior ROK category. Maini was awarded the best rookie at Rowrah while racing in the MSA British Karting Championship. He also finished in second place in Junior category in the Indonesia Kart Prix 2012 along with first place in the Junior max category in Rotax Invitational Karting Race held at Kuala Lumpur.

Lower formulae 
Maini then stepped up into cars in 2013. He finished runner up in the J.K.Tyre Racing Series championship, winning two races at the Buddh International Circuit as well as winning the Malaysian Super 6 Series. He also competed in the WSK Euro and Master karting in the KF category.

In 2014 he then went on to compete in the BRDC Formula 4 championship; finishing second overall and missing out on the championship by 3 points to teammate George Russell. He finished the championship with 8 wins and 9 podium finishes. He was also the highest ranked Indian driver in the Driver Database 
At the beginning of 2015 Maini showed remarkable pace in the Toyota Racing Series in New Zealand en route to a 4th overall in the championship with two wins, five podiums and 3 poles. He also finished 4th overall in Race 2 of the Pau Grand Prix. However, a learning year in the FIA European Formula 3 series meant he could only manage 18th overall and 9th in the rookie class. Maini did manage to end the season on a high, finishing 10th at the Macau Grand Prix.

GP3 Series

2016 

In 2016, Maini raced for Jenzer Motorsport in the GP3 series, he finished the season in 10th position in the championship despite missing the first 4 races. He also became the first Indian to secure a podium in the GP3 series at Hungaroring, after finishing 2nd. Maini also raced in the Macau GP for Team Motopark.

2017 
The Indian signed for Jenzer again in 2017, for his second stint in the GP3 Series. He scored two podiums, including a victory in the sprint race at Circuit de Barcelona-Catalunya, and ended up 9th in the championship, two positions behind teammate Alessio Lorandi.

FIA Formula 2 Championship 
At the end of 2017 he took part in a post season test in Abu Dhabi with F2 teams Trident and Russian Time.

2018 
Maini signed for Trident Racing in the 2018 FIA Formula 2 Championship, partnering fellow Haas F1 Team development driver Santino Ferrucci.

2019 

Maini replaced Dorian Boccolacci at Campos Racing in the 2019 FIA Formula 2 Championship at Spielberg. He raced in six races, scoring no points, before being replaced by Marino Sato.

Formula One 
In May 2017, it was announced that Haas F1 team signed Maini as a development driver. He remained in his role throughout 2018.

Endurance racing 
Maini changed from single seaters to Endurance racing in the European Le Mans Series with RLR M SPORT. He also competed in the prestigious 2019 24 Hours of Le Mans as well as competing in the Asian Le Mans Series where he won the first race at Shanghai International Circuit.

DTM 
In 2021 Maini joined the Deutsche Tourenwagen Masters driving for Mercedes-AMG Team GetSpeed. He picked up his first podium finish in the series at the Norisring. This was also the first podium finish by an Indian in the history of the series.

Karting record

Karting career summary

Racing record

Racing career summary

* Season still in progress.

Complete BRDC Formula 4 Championship results
(key) (Races in bold indicate pole position) (Races in italics indicate points for the fastest lap of top ten finishers)

Complete Toyota Racing Series results
(key) (Races in bold indicate pole position) (Races in italics indicate fastest lap)

Complete FIA Formula 3 European Championship results 
(key) (Races in bold indicate pole position) (Races in italics indicate fastest lap)

Complete GP3 Series results 
(key) (Races in bold indicate pole position) (Races in italics indicate fastest lap)

† Driver did not finish the race, but was classified as he completed over 90% of the race distance.

Complete FIA Formula 2 Championship results
(key) (Races in bold indicate pole position) (Races in italics indicate points for the fastest lap of top ten finishers)

Complete European Le Mans Series results
(key) (Races in bold indicate pole position; results in italics indicate fastest lap)

Complete 24 Hours of Le Mans results

Complete Deutsche Tourenwagen Masters results 
(key) (Races in bold indicate pole position) (Races in italics indicate fastest lap)

Complete GT World Challenge Europe Endurance Cup results

*Season still in progress.

References

External links
 Website
 

1997 births
Living people
Indian racing drivers
Toyota Racing Series drivers
FIA Formula 3 European Championship drivers
Indian GP3 Series drivers
FIA Formula 2 Championship drivers
Sportspeople from Bangalore
European Le Mans Series drivers
24 Hours of Le Mans drivers
Deutsche Tourenwagen Masters drivers
Asian Le Mans Series drivers
Mercedes-AMG Motorsport drivers
Van Amersfoort Racing drivers
M2 Competition drivers
Jenzer Motorsport drivers
Trident Racing drivers
Campos Racing drivers
Team Meritus drivers
EuroInternational drivers
T-Sport drivers